Shi Yong is a fictional character in Water Margin, one of the Four Great Classical Novels of Chinese literature. Nicknamed "Stone General", he ranks 99th among the 108 Stars of Destiny and 63rd among the 72 Earthly Fiends.

Background
The novel depicts Shi Yong as eight chi tall and having a pale yellowish complexion, sharp eyes and a clean shaven face. Shi Yong, who was born and lives in Daming Prefecture (大名府; present-day Daming County, Hebei), is a hardcore gambler. He flees Daming and hides in the house of the nobleman Chai Jin after killing a man in a fit of anger over some gambling matter.

Joining Liangshan
Shi Yong later goes to seek refuge under Song Jiang, but the latter has run away after killing his mistress Yan Poxi. Shi stays for a while entertained by Song Jiang's younger brother Song Qing. When he leaves, Song Qing asks him to deliver a letter to Song Jiang should he run into him. Meanwhile, Song Jiang has assembled a group of heroes at Qingzhou, Shandong, after getting into trouble with the local government. He decides to take them to join the outlaws of Liangshan Marsh for fear that Qingzhou would send a big force to exterminate them. 

On the way to Liangshan, Song Jiang and his men come to a village inn and have their meal there. Shi Yong is occupying the biggest table alone in the inn which he refuses to concede to the group. A quarrel ensues and Shi Yong proclaims that he would only give way to only two persons, dismissing even the emperor as a nobody. Those two persons, he declares, are Chai Jin and Song Jiang. Shi Yong is shocked when Song discloses his identity and apologises for being mean. He then hands over the letter from Song Qing, which conveys to Song Jiang the false news that his father has died and urges him to rush home for the funeral. Song Jiang thus breaks away from the group leaving them, including Shi Yong, to go to Liangshan without him.

Campaigns and death
Shi Yong is appointed as one of the leaders of Liangshan's infantry after the 108 Stars of Destiny came together in what is called the Grand Assembly. He participates in the campaigns against the Liao invaders and rebel forces in Song territory following amnesty from Emperor Huizong for Liangshan.

In the attack on Shezhou in the campaign against Fang La, Shi Yong and Li Yun together encounter Wang Yin, one of Fang's key lieutenants. Both are killed by Wang.

References
 
 
 
 
 
 
 

72 Earthly Fiends
Fictional gamblers
Fictional characters from Hebei